Patrick Musotsi Matasi (born 11 December 1987) is a Kenyan international footballer who plays as a goalkeeper for Ethiopian Premier League club Saint George.

Career
Matasi played club football for Kabrass United, A.F.C. Leopards, Posta Rangers and Tusker before signing a three-year contract with Ethiopian Premier League club Saint George in October 2018.

He made his international debut for Kenya in 2017.

References

1987 births
Living people
Kenyan footballers
Kenya international footballers
Association football goalkeepers
West Kenya Sugar F.C. players
A.F.C. Leopards players
Posta Rangers F.C. players
Tusker F.C. players
Saint George S.C. players
Kenyan Premier League players
Kenyan expatriate footballers
Expatriate footballers in Ethiopia
2019 Africa Cup of Nations players